An angstloch (apparently "fear hole", but more probably from the Lat. angustus "narrow" and German Loch "hole") was a small hole in the floor of medieval castles and fortresses that led to a cellar or basement room below. The term is German and has no English equivalent, although a door, where there is one, to such a hole is called a trapdoor (German: Falltür). 

An angstloch is usually located above the basement of a fighting tower or Bergfried. The description of these basement rooms as "dungeons" stems from the romanticised castle studies of the 19th century. There is no evidence to indicate that prisoners were actually lowered through the angstloch into the dungeon using a rope or rope ladder as these 19th century accounts suggest. Archaeological finds, by contrast, indicate the use of these basement spaces as store rooms. For example, piles of stones have been found in such rooms that suggest they were used as a store for projectiles to be used in time of siege.

Literature 
 Günther Binding: Architektonische Formenlehre. Wissenschaftliche Buchgesellschaft, Darmstadt, 1987, .
 Alois Brandstetter: Die Burg. Residenz Verlag, 1986, p. 293.
 Otto Piper: Abriss der Burgenkunde. Göschen Collection, Volume 119. G. J. Göschen, 1900, pp. 47ff..
 Otto Piper: Burgenkunde. Weidlich, 1967, p. 664.

Medieval architecture
Castle architecture
German words and phrases
Words and phrases with no direct English translation